Philip Harris or Phillip Harris may refer to:
 Philip Harris Ltd., a British laboratory supply company
 Philip Harris, Baron Harris of Peckham (born 1942), English Conservative member of the House of Lords and businessman
 Philip Harris (artist) (born 1965), British painter
 Phillip Harris, figure skater

See also
 Phil Harris (disambiguation)

Harris, Philip